Eric Jerrod Swann (born August 16, 1970) is a former professional American football player who was selected by the Phoenix/Arizona Cardinals in the 1st round (6th overall) of the 1991 NFL Draft. A 6'5", 317 lbs. defensive tackle, Swann never attended college and was drafted from a semi-professional football team called the Bay State Titans located in Lynn, Massachusetts. He played in ten NFL seasons from 1991 to 2000 for the Cardinals and the Carolina Panthers.

High school
Swann played high school football at Western Harnett High School in Lillington, North Carolina, and graduated in 1989. During his high school years, he was state runner-up in shot-put and discus throwing, recording distances of 54' 02" and 152' 06", respectively.

Semi-pro career
Swann was bound for North Carolina State University, but was ruled academically ineligible. Rather than enrolling as a Proposition 48 In 1990, he left Wake Technical to join the semi-pro Bay State Titans in Lynn, Massachusetts with a $5 an hour salary.

Professional career
On April 24, 1991, Swann signed a five-year contract with the Phoenix Cardinals. In 1995 and 1996, Swann was named an NFL All Pro and to those years' Pro Bowl teams.

In 1998, Swann re-signed with the Cardinals for a five-year, $25 million contract with a $7.5 million signing bonus. At that point in time, it was the richest contract ever signed by a Cardinals player in the history of the franchise. Because he was recovering from knee surgeries, Swann did not practice with the Cardinals in the 1999 training camp period. In 1999, he played nine games and had four sacks and a 42-yard interception.

The Cardinals waived Swann on July 11, 2000. Two weeks later, he signed a one-year, veterans' minimum deal with the Carolina Panthers along with Reggie White.

Eric Swann agreed in 2007 to play for the Hudson Valley Saints, who are a member of the North American Football League.

Eric Swann was inducted into the American Football Association's Semi Pro Football Hall of Fame in 1998.

References 

1970 births
Living people
African-American players of American football
American football defensive ends
American football defensive tackles
Arizona Cardinals players
Carolina Panthers players
National Conference Pro Bowl players
Phoenix Cardinals players
People from Lillington, North Carolina
People from Sanford, North Carolina
Players of American football from North Carolina
Players of American football from Phoenix, Arizona
21st-century African-American sportspeople
20th-century African-American sportspeople